DSK Bank (Banka DSK; formerly Държавна спестовна каса, Darzhavna spestovna kasa — State Savings Bank) is a major Bulgarian bank. It has been owned by the Hungarian OTP Bank since 2003, being transformed into a joint-stock company in 1999, and was founded in 1951 as the country's savings bank.

History
The Bank was established under the name of the State Savings Bank (DSK) in 1951 by a decision of the Council of Ministers of the then People's Republic of Bulgaria. It included the State Savings Bank and the nationalised cooperative popular banks and agricultural credit cooperatives. It received exclusive rights to receive deposits from private individuals in the country. Initially, they were used exclusively for lending to the state, and from the mid-1960s the bank was given the opportunity to provide consumer loans and housing loans to private individuals. Until 1971, it was headed by the Ministry of Finance, and then by the Bulgarian National Bank.

2011
According to the Individual - Non-Audited financial statement for the first three cumulated quarters of 2011, total net operating revenues of DSK Bank increased by 6.73%, from BGN 443,030 thousands to BGN 472,855 thousands. Operating result decreased from BGN 106,152 thousands to BGN 57,477 thousands, which means -45.85% change. The results of the period decreased 39.24%, reaching BGN 61,618 thousands at the end of the period against BGN 101,414 thousands previous year.

Operations 
In April 2022, DSK Bank announced its partnership agreement with Amsterdam based fintech software provider Backbase.

See also
 List of banks in Bulgaria

References

External links
 

Banks of Bulgaria
Banks established in 1951
1951 establishments in Bulgaria
People's Republic of Bulgaria